Fineveke is a village in Wallis and Futuna. It is located in Mua District on the southwest coast of Wallis Island, just northwest of Halalo. Lake Lanutavake lies just to the northeast.

Overview
It hosts a small private marina, visible on google maps with 14 boats harbored. The "chief of the rails" of Wallis lived in Fineveke.

References

Populated places in Wallis and Futuna